The Mount Hood Hotel Annex is a historic hotel building in Hood River, Oregon, United States.  The brick building occupies a  lot at the northwest corner of Oak and First Streets in Hood River.  It was completed in 1912 as an expansion of the Mt. Hood Hotel on the next lot.  The original hotel was built in 1881. The original hotel was expanded after 1886, to three stories.  It had a mansard observation tower and an encircling double veranda. The original building fronted on first street and the Oregon-Washington Railroad and Navigation Company passenger station and the Columbia River just north. As travel moved to automobile travel, the premier hotel to the north, took a back seat to the annex. The original building was closed after 1926 and then removed circa 1930.

It was listed on the National Register of Historic Places in 1994.

See also

National Register of Historic Places listings in Hood River County, Oregon

References

External links

1912 establishments in Oregon
Buildings and structures in Hood River, Oregon
Buildings designated early commercial in the National Register of Historic Places
Commercial buildings completed in 1912
National Register of Historic Places in Hood River County, Oregon